The Argentine Civil Wars were a series of internecine wars that took place in Argentina from 1814 to 1876. These conflicts were separate from the Argentine War of Independence (1810 — 1820), though they first arose during this period.

The main antagonists were, on a geographical level, Buenos Aires Province against the other provinces of modern Argentina, and on a political level, the Federal Party against the Unitarian Party. The central cause of the conflict was the excessive centralism advanced by Buenos Aires leaders and, for a long period, the monopoly on the use of the Port of Buenos Aires as the sole means for international commerce. Other participants at specific times included Uruguay, and the British and French empires, notably in the French blockade of the Río de la Plata of 1838 and in the Anglo-French blockade of the Río de la Plata that ended in 1850.

Timeline

1829
 Juan Manuel de Rosas and Juan Lavalle sign the Cañuelas Pact.
 Juan Manuel de Rosas is elected governor of Buenos Aires.

1830
 José María Paz defeats Facundo Quiroga in the battle of Oncativo.
 Paz establish the Unitarian League.
 Buenos Aires, Entre Ríos and Santa Fe sign the Federal Pact.

1831
 Mendoza and Córdoba join the Federal Pact.

1832
 Santiago del Estero, La Rioja, Tucumán, Salta, San Luis, Catamarca and San Juan join the Federal Pact.
 Rosas declines a reelection as governor, the legislature elects Juan Ramón Balcarce.

1833
 Rosas starts the first conquest of the desert.
 Revolution of the Restorers against Balcarce. Juan José Viamonte replaces him as governor.

1834
 Viamonte resigns, and Manuel Vicente Maza replaces him.

1835
 Facundo Quiroga is murdered in Córdoba.
 Juan Manuel de Rosas is appointed governor, with the sum of public power.
 Rosas established the Customs Law

1836
 Fructuoso Rivera starts a rebellion against Uruguayan president Manuel Oribe. Birth of the two main Uruguayan parties: Colorados (for Rivera) and Blancos (for Oribe).

1837
 Argentina joins the War of the Confederation.
 Execution of the Reinafé brothers, accused of murder of Quiroga.

1838
 France imposes the French blockade of the Río de la Plata to Buenos Aires
 Rivera ousted Oribe from power, becoming the new president of Uruguay
 Death of Estanislao López, governor of Santa Fe.
 Murder of Alejandro Heredia, governor of Tucuman

1839
 Rivera declares war to Argentina
 Berón de Estrada, governor of Corrientes, declares war to Rosas. He was defeated by Echagüe at Pago Largo.
 Juan Lavalle invades Entre Ríos
 Failed conspiracy of Ramón Maza against Rosas. The Mazorca kills Manuel Maza during the conflict.
 Revolution of the "Libres del Sur"

1840
 Juan Lavalle is defeated by Pascual Echagüe in Entre Ríos at the Battle of Don Cristóbal (10 April 1840) and the Battle of Sauce Grande (16 July 1840).
 José María Paz is appointed head of the forces of Corrientes
 France lifts the blockade
 Manuel Oribe defeats Lavalle in Córdoba in the Battle of Quebracho Herrado
 Domingo Faustino Sarmiento moves to Chile.

1841
 Oribe defeats Lavalle in the battle of Famaillá.
 Aráoz de Lamadrid is defeated in the Battle of Rodeo del Medio
 Lavalle dies in Jujuy, in a confusing episode
 Justo José de Urquiza is appointed governor of Entre Ríos.

Bibliography
 

Argentine Civil War
Argentina history-related lists